Humberto Martins Barbosa (born 10 June 1939) is a Brazilian former footballer.

References

1939 births
Living people
Association football forwards
Brazilian footballers
CR Flamengo footballers
Pan American Games medalists in football
Pan American Games silver medalists for Brazil
Footballers at the 1959 Pan American Games
Medalists at the 1959 Pan American Games